The Big Ten Men's Ice Hockey Tournament is the conference tournament for the Big Ten Conference. The winner of the tournament receives an automatic berth into the NCAA Tournament.

The tournament was first held in 2014, the first year of conference play; the first four tournaments alternated between Xcel Energy Center in Saint Paul, Minnesota and Joe Louis Arena in Detroit, Michigan. Due to the addition of Notre Dame to conference play, a new playoff format was introduced for the 2018 tournament, utilizing campus sites instead.

Format

2014–2017
From 2014 through 2017, all six Big Ten teams participated in a single-elimination tournament held over three days at one neutral host site.  These four tournaments alternated between Xcel Energy Center in Saint Paul, Minnesota and Joe Louis Arena in Detroit, Michigan.

Teams were seeded by the regular-season conference standings. In the quarterfinals on Thursday of the tournament weekend, No. 3 played No. 6 and No. 4 played No. 5. On Friday, No. 2 played the winner of the first game and No. 1 played the winner of the second game (the teams were not reseeded). The two semifinal winners played each other on Saturday in the final.

2018–2020
Due to poor attendance at the neutral site tournaments, and the addition of Notre Dame as a seventh Big Ten team in hockey, a new format was introduced in 2018. The No. 1 team in the regular-season conference standings automatically advances to the conference semifinals, while the remaining teams are seeded into best-of-three quarterfinals to determine the three remaining teams. The remainder of the playoff is single-elimination.

All games are held at the home arena of the team with the higher seed, rather than a neutral site. In order to reduce the likelihood of scheduling conflicts at team venues, the semifinals and championship are played as single games (in contrast to other conference tournaments). The 2020 tournament was cancelled due to the COVID-19 pandemic.

2021–present
The 2021 tournament will return to a single-elimination tournament held over three days at one neutral host site for the first time since 2017.

Members 
There are currently seven member schools, with all seven participating in the men's division.

Big Ten Men's Ice Hockey Tournament champions

Championship records

By school

By coach

References

External links
Big Ten Conference
Big Ten Men's Ice Hockey Tournament